Amberson is an unincorporated community in Fannett Township in Franklin County, Pennsylvania, United States.

Geography 
Amberson is located along Amberson Road in a narrow valley to the northwest of Roxbury.

History 
Fannett Township was incorporated as part of Cumberland County in 1761, and Francis Amberson settled in the valley in 1763. Evidence points to there having been settlers in Amberson prior to Francis, however. Fannett Township was included in the new Franklin County when it was incorporated in 1784.

References

Unincorporated communities in Franklin County, Pennsylvania
Unincorporated communities in Pennsylvania